Craugastor opimus is a species of frogs in the family Craugastoridae.

It is found in Colombia and Panama.
Its natural habitats are subtropical or tropical moist lowland forests and subtropical or tropical moist montane forests.

References

opimus
Amphibians described in 2002
Frogs of South America
Amphibians of Colombia
Amphibians of Panama
Taxonomy articles created by Polbot